Hélène Florent is a Canadian film and television actress. Her roles have included the television series Les Invincibles, Toute la vérité, La galère, and the 2000s revival of Lance et compte, as well as the films Yellowknife, Familia, Life with My Father (La Vie avec mon père) and Café de Flore. She garnered a Genie Award nomination for Best Supporting Actress at the 32nd Genie Awards for her performance in Café de Flore.  That film also got her nominated for a Satellite Award for Best Supporting Actress in 2012.

At the 24th Quebec Cinema Awards in 2022 she won both Best Actress for Drunken Birds (Les Oiseaux ivres) and Best Supporting Actress for Maria Chapdelaine, becoming the first actress in the history of the awards to win both categories in the same year.

Selected filmography
Blind Spot (Lucidité passagère) - 2009
Sarah Prefers to Run (Sarah préfère la course) - 2013
Maria Chapdelaine  - 2021
Drunken Birds (Les Oiseaux ivres) - 2021

References

External links

Canadian film actresses
Canadian television actresses
Actresses from Quebec
Living people
Year of birth missing (living people)
21st-century Canadian actresses
Best Actress Jutra and Iris Award winners
Best Supporting Actress Jutra and Iris Award winners